In the mathematical discipline of graph theory, a matching or independent edge set in an undirected graph is a set of edges without common vertices. In other words, a subset of the edges is a matching if each vertex appears in at most one edge of that matching. Finding a matching in a bipartite graph can be treated as a network flow problem.

Definitions 

Given a graph  a matching M in G is a set of pairwise non-adjacent edges, none of which are loops; that is, no two edges share common vertices.

A vertex is matched (or saturated) if it is an endpoint of one of the edges in the matching.  Otherwise the vertex is unmatched (or unsaturated).

A maximal matching is a matching M of a graph G that is not a subset of any other matching. A matching M of a graph G is maximal if every edge in G has a non-empty intersection with at least one edge in M. The following figure shows examples of maximal matchings (red) in three graphs.

A maximum matching (also known as maximum-cardinality matching) is a matching that contains the largest possible number of edges.  There may be many maximum matchings.  The matching number  of a graph  is the size of a maximum matching. Every maximum matching is maximal, but not every maximal matching is a maximum matching. The following figure shows examples of maximum matchings in the same three graphs.

A perfect matching is a matching that matches all vertices of the graph. That is, a matching is perfect if every vertex of the graph is incident to an edge of the matching. A matching is perfect if |E|=|V|/2. Every perfect matching is maximum and hence maximal. In some literature, the term complete matching is used. In the above figure, only part (b) shows a perfect matching. A perfect matching is also a minimum-size edge cover. Thus, the size of a maximum matching is no larger than the size of a minimum edge cover: . A graph can only contain a perfect matching when the graph has an even number of vertices.

A near-perfect matching is one in which exactly one vertex is unmatched.  Clearly, a graph can only contain a near-perfect matching when the graph has an odd number of vertices, and near-perfect matchings are maximum matchings. In the above figure, part (c) shows a near-perfect matching. If every vertex is unmatched by some near-perfect matching, then the graph is called factor-critical.

Given a matching M, an alternating path is a path that begins with an unmatched vertex and whose edges belong alternately to the matching and not to the matching. An augmenting path is an alternating path that starts from and ends on free (unmatched) vertices. Berge's lemma states that a matching M is maximum if and only if there is no augmenting path with respect to M.

An induced matching is a matching that is the edge set of an induced subgraph.

Properties 

In any graph without isolated vertices, the sum of the matching number and the edge covering number equals the number of vertices.

Further we deduce that

In particular, this shows that any maximal matching is a 2-approximation of a maximum matching and also a 2-approximation of a minimum maximal matching. This inequality is tight: for example, if  is a path with 3 edges and 4 vertices, the size of a minimum maximal matching is 1 and the size of a maximum matching is 2.

A spectral characterization of the matching number of a graph is given by Hassani Monfared and Mallik as follows:  Let  be a graph on  vertices, and  be  distinct nonzero purely imaginary numbers where .

Matching polynomials 

A generating function of the number of k-edge matchings in a graph is called a matching polynomial.  Let G be a graph and mk be the number of k-edge matchings.  One matching polynomial of G is

Another definition gives the matching polynomial as

where n is the number of vertices in the graph.  Each type has its uses; for more information see the article on matching polynomials.

Algorithms and computational complexity

Maximum-cardinality matching 

A fundamental problem in combinatorial optimization is finding a maximum matching. This problem has various algorithms for different classes of graphs.

In an unweighted bipartite graph, the optimization problem is to find a maximum cardinality matching.  The problem is solved by the Hopcroft-Karp algorithm in time  time, and there are more efficient randomized algorithms, approximation algorithms, and algorithms for special classes of graphs such as bipartite planar graphs, as described in the main article.

Maximum-weight matching 

In a weighted bipartite graph, the optimization problem is to find a maximum-weight matching; a dual problem is to find a minimum-weight matching. This problem is often called maximum weighted bipartite matching, or the assignment problem. The Hungarian algorithm solves the assignment problem and it was one of the beginnings of combinatorial optimization algorithms. It uses a modified shortest path search in the augmenting path algorithm. If the Bellman–Ford algorithm is used for this step, the running time of the Hungarian algorithm becomes , or the edge cost can be shifted with a potential to achieve  running time with the Dijkstra algorithm and Fibonacci heap.

In a non-bipartite weighted graph, the problem of maximum weight matching can be solved in time   using Edmonds' blossom algorithm.

Maximal matchings 

A maximal matching can be found with a simple greedy algorithm. A maximum matching is also a maximal matching, and hence it is possible to find a largest maximal matching in polynomial time. However, no polynomial-time algorithm is known for finding a minimum maximal matching, that is, a maximal matching that contains the smallest possible number of edges.

A maximal matching with k edges is an edge dominating set with k edges. Conversely, if we are given a minimum edge dominating set with k edges, we can construct a maximal matching with k edges in polynomial time. Therefore, the problem of finding a minimum maximal matching is essentially equal to the problem of finding a minimum edge dominating set. Both of these two optimization problems are known to be NP-hard; the decision versions of these problems are classical examples of NP-complete problems. Both problems can be approximated within factor 2 in polynomial time: simply find an arbitrary maximal matching M.

Counting problems 

The number of matchings in a graph is known as the Hosoya index of the graph. It is #P-complete to compute this quantity, even for bipartite graphs. It is also #P-complete to count perfect matchings, even in bipartite graphs, because computing the permanent of an arbitrary 0–1 matrix (another #P-complete problem) is the same as computing the number of perfect matchings in the bipartite graph having the given matrix as its biadjacency matrix. However, there exists a fully polynomial time randomized approximation scheme for counting the number of bipartite matchings. A remarkable theorem of Kasteleyn states that the number of perfect matchings in a planar graph can be computed exactly in polynomial time via the FKT algorithm.

The number of perfect matchings in a complete graph Kn (with n even) is given by the double factorial (n − 1)!!. The numbers of matchings in complete graphs, without constraining the matchings to be perfect, are given by the telephone numbers.

Finding all maximally-matchable edges 

One of the basic problems in matching theory is to find in a given graph all edges that may be extended to a maximum matching in the graph (such edges are called maximally-matchable edges, or allowed edges). Algorithms for this problem include:

 For general graphs, a deterministic algorithm in time  and a randomized algorithm in time .
 For bipartite graphs, if a single maximum matching is found, a deterministic algorithm runs in time .

Online bipartite matching 
The problem of developing an online algorithm for matching was first considered by Richard M. Karp, Umesh Vazirani, and Vijay Vazirani in 1990. 

In the online setting, nodes on one side of the bipartite graph arrive one at a time and must either be immediately matched to the other side of the graph or discarded. This is a natural generalization of the secretary problem and has applications to online ad auctions.

Characterizations 

Kőnig's theorem states that, in bipartite graphs, the maximum matching is equal in size to the minimum vertex cover. Via this result, the minimum vertex cover, maximum independent set, and maximum vertex biclique problems may be solved in polynomial time for bipartite graphs.

Hall's marriage theorem provides a characterization of bipartite graphs which have a perfect matching and the Tutte theorem provides a characterization for arbitrary graphs.

Applications

Matching in general graphs 
 A Kekulé structure of an aromatic compound consists of a perfect matching of its carbon skeleton, showing the locations of double bonds in the chemical structure. These structures are named after Friedrich August Kekulé von Stradonitz, who showed that benzene (in graph theoretical terms, a 6-vertex cycle) can be given such a structure.
 The Hosoya index is the number of non-empty matchings plus one; it is used in computational chemistry and mathematical chemistry investigations for organic compounds.
 The Chinese postman problem involves finding a minimum-weight perfect matching as a subproblem.

Matching in bipartite graphs 
 Graduation problem is about choosing minimum set of classes from given requirements for graduation.
 Hitchcock transport problem involves bipartite matching as sub-problem.
 Subtree isomorphism problem involves bipartite matching as sub-problem.

See also 
 Matching in hypergraphs - a generalization of matching in graphs.
 Fractional matching.
 Dulmage–Mendelsohn decomposition, a partition of the vertices of a bipartite graph into subsets such that each edge belongs to a perfect matching if and only if its endpoints belong to the same subset
 Edge coloring, a partition of the edges of a graph into matchings
 Matching preclusion, the minimum number of edges to delete to prevent a perfect matching from existing
 Rainbow matching, a matching in an edge-colored bipartite graph with no repeated colors
 Skew-symmetric graph, a type of graph that can be used to model alternating path searches for matchings
 Stable matching, a matching in which no two elements prefer each other to their matched partners
 Independent vertex set, a set of vertices (rather than edges) no two of which are adjacent to each other
 Stable marriage problem (also known as stable matching problem)

References

Further reading

External links 
 A graph library with Hopcroft–Karp and Push–Relabel-based maximum cardinality matching implementation 

 
Combinatorial optimization
Polynomial-time problems
Computational problems in graph theory